Mangia (also styled Mangia, with a trailing apostrophe) is a video game for the Atari 2600 released by Spectravision in 1983. The title "Mangia" is an Italian word meaning "eat!". The North American version is one of the rarest games for the 2600.

Gameplay

The player controls a young boy who must eat plates of pasta placed in front of him by his mother, who will keep feeding him until his stomach explodes on-screen. To prevent this, the player can throw it to a cat, who occasionally appears at the window, and a dog, who walks across the bottom of the screen. However, if the mother sees the pasta being thrown to the cat or dog, she brings three times as much pasta the next time she returns.

The joystick is used to control the player: pressing right causes the boy to grab a plate of pasta, pressing left causes him to eat it, and pressing up or down causes him to toss the pasta to the cat (named Frankie in the manual) or the dog (named Sergio) respectively. If the cat and dog are not nearby when the food is thrown to them, the mother returns with extra pasta to "punish" the player. The fire button is not used.

If, instead of eating the pasta or throwing it to the animals, the player is idle, the pasta will accumulate on the table until it breaks, causing the player to lose a turn. Attempting to eat all the pasta without giving any to the cat or dog will cause the boy's stomach to swell, changing colors from blue to yellow to red, before finally exploding in a mass of chunky blue pixels.

References

External links
Mangia at Atari Mania

1983 video games
Action video games
Atari 2600 games
Atari 2600-only games
North America-exclusive video games
Video games about children
Video games about food and drink
Video games developed in the United States